In a social network analysis (as in blockmodeling), a positive or a negative 'friendship' can be established between two nodes in a network; this results in a signed network. As social interaction between people can be positive or negative, so can be links between the nodes (representing persons). 

When a positive or a negative value is attributed on the relationship between the two nodes, it is called a user evaluation. In social groups, people can like or dislike, respect or disrespect other people in their social groups.

The quality of such connections can be further analysed, as a positive connections can have a positive influence on the whole network (one person on social group or society in general) and vice versa.

When network connections are not evaluated between the nodes (e.g., all connections are regarded as positive - as they exist), then such a network is defined as an unsigned network.

References

See also
 Signed graph
 Balance theory

Social network analysis